Interactive Scenario Builder (Builder) is a modeling and simulation, three-dimensional application developed by the Advanced Tactical Environmental Simulation Team (ATEST) at the Naval Research Laboratory (NRL) that aids in understanding radio frequency (RF) and electro-optical/infrared (EO/IR) propagation.

Uses 

RF and EO/IR tactical decision aid
Creation/generation of complex electronic warfare (EW) synthetic environments (scenarios)
Simulation of both hardware and/or modeling of existing and future EW systems
Visualization of the RF capabilities of platforms
Modeling the communication of radar systems by calculating one-way and two-way RF propagation loss
Pre-mission planning
Near-realtime, geospatial and temporal situational awareness
After-action debriefing
Acquisition
Support to operations (Ops)
Surface EW test and evaluation (T&E)
Training
Options development
Targeting support

Operational use 
 The Effectiveness of Navy Electronic Warfare Systems (ENEWS) group used Builder to support the design, specification, and evaluation of EA-6B and AN/SLY-2 (AIEWS) EW systems from the conceptual through the design stages.
 The Fleet Information Warfare Center (FIWC) used Builder to assist in EW asset scheduling and allocation during Operation Desert Fox and the Kosovo campaign.
 The U.S. Army’s 160th Special Operations Aviation Regiment uses Builder for mission planning and mission rehearsal.

Developer information 

Builder is developed by the:

Advanced Tactical Environmental Simulation Team (ATEST) (Code 5774)
Electronic Warfare Modeling & Simulation (EW M&S) Branch (Code 5770)
Tactical Electronic Warfare Division (TEWD) (Code 5700)
Systems Directorate (Code 5000)
Naval Research Laboratory (NRL)
Office of Naval Research (ONR)

A listing in the Department of Defense (DoD) Modeling and Simulation Resource Registry (MSRR) states that "The primary objective of the Electronic Warfare Modeling and Simulation Branch is to develop and utilize tools for effectiveness evaluations of present, proposed, and future electronic warfare (EW) concepts, systems, and configurations for U.S. Naval Units." The EW M&S Branch used to be known as the Effectiveness of Navy Electronic Warfare Systems (ENEWS) Group (Code 5707) circa 2005. At that time, the Builder Team was under Code 5707.4. In an NRL "Solicitation, Offer and Award" document, the "Statement of Work" section states that "Code 5707 has historically developed simulations of naval EW systems,
anti-ship threats, and military communication systems to support the development,
fielding and testing of electronic and weapons systems."

See also 
Office of Naval Research (ONR), a sponsor of Builder development
Naval Research Laboratory (NRL)
SIMDIS, another application developed by the EW M&S Branch

References

General references

Further reading 
Papers used as references

Other papers

External links 
Interactive Scenario Builder website
Tactical Electronic Warfare Division website

3D graphics software
Cross-platform software
Electromagnetic simulation software
Electronic warfare
GIS software
Government software
Information operations and warfare
Infrared
Java (programming language) software
Military simulation
Radio frequency propagation
Virtual globes